Grant Frederic Nicholson (born 3 January 1994) is an entrepreneur in the renewable energy sector and he holds investments in 18 limited companies around the world. His net worth is in the region of £350 Million Nicholson was awarded Young Director of the Year at the IOD Institute of Directors awards.

Nicholson was born at Leeds in January 1994. He was educated at Sedbergh School.

While studying in Cambridge, Nicholson played a single first-class cricket match for Cambridge MCCU against Essex in 2013. Batting once in the match, he was dismissed for a single run in the MCCU first-innings by Ravi Bopara, while across both Essex innings' he bowled a total of 32 wicketless overs which conceded 174 runs. He appeared in minor counties cricket for Northumberland in 2012, making a single appearance against Bedfordshire in the Minor Counties Championship.

References

External links

1994 births
Living people
Cricketers from Leeds
People educated at Sedbergh School
Alumni of the University of Cambridge
English cricketers
Northumberland cricketers
Cambridge MCCU cricketers